TMEM44 (Transmembrane protein 44) is a protein that in humans is encoded by the TMEM44 gene. DKFZp686O18124 is a synonym of TMEM44.

Gene 

TMEM44 gene has 14 transcripts (splice variants). The whole span of the gene is 46,016 base pairs long, while the mRNA sequence of TMEM44 is 1,483 base pairs long, with 13 exons. Exon 1 and 2 partial are part of 5'-UTR, and the partial exon 2 is only highly conserved in primates.

Regulation 
There are 5 experimentally verified promoters, and 4 predicted ones. Promoter GXP_232172, which is promoter set 5 is the longest with 1,276 base pairs and a total of 11 coding transcripts.

Expression 

There is an overall low level expression of TMEM44 gene throughout the body parts and throughout the developmental stages of humans. Some parts where TMEM44 expression is detected are in bone, brain, eye, ovary, pancreas and uterus. Some expression was also detected under certain health conditions including gastrointestinal tumor, glioma, ovarian tumor,   pancreatic tumor, muscle tissue tumor and uterine tumor.

Locus 

TMEM44 gene is located near the end of the long arm of chromosome 3 (3q29) in humans (Homo sapiens).

Protein 

TMEM44 is 428 amino acids in length. The molecular weight of the protein is 47.1kDa, and its formula is  C2086H3315N585O611S22, with a total of 6,619 atoms. The theoretical isoelectric point (pI) of TMEM44 is 8.12. The instability index (II) of TMEM44 is 47.96, which classifies the protein as unstable. There are 12 isoforms of TMEM44, with isoform c being the longest. The function of TMEM44 is currently unknown.

Subcellular Localization 
The C-terminus of TMEM44 is found in the cytoplasm, and the protein is predicted to be integrated within the membrane of the endoplasmic reticulum.

Secondary Structure 
TMEM44 has 41.12% of alpha helix, 15.65% of extended strand and 43.22% of random coil.

Transmembrane Region Allocation 

There are seven predicted transmembrane domains in TMEM44 protein.

Interacting Proteins 

GSK3B (Glycogen synthase kinase 3 beta), KAT6B (Histone acetyltransferase KAT6B/Histone acetyltransferase MYST4), TMEM31 (Transmembrane protein 31), SPAG9 (sperm associated antigen 9) and TNKS (tankyrase-1) are predicted to interact with TMEM44.

Post-Translational Modification 

TMEM44 undergoes threonine, tyrosine and serine phosphorylations. Many serine phosphorylation takes place near the C-terminus, causing it to be negatively charged.

The Glycine (G) found nearest from the C-terminus is predicted to have glycosylphosphatidylinositol (GPI) attached, which anchors the protein to the cellular plasma membrane.

The first 45 amino acids serve as a signal peptide cleavage site.

Conservation

Orthologs 
Orthologs with the TMEM44 protein include amphibians, birds, fish, and mammals. The closest ortholog from human with TMEM44 is common chimpanzee (Pan troglodytes) with 98% identity, and the most distantly related ortholog is common carp (Cyprinus carpio) with 27% identity.

12 selected orthologs of TMEM44 are shown below.

TMEM44 is generally fast evolving, with about 0.310 changes of amino acids per 100 over a million year.

Paralogs 
Predicted paralogous proteins of TMEM44 are C9IZ85, F8WCY1, F8WE47, H7C3X7, J3KQW3, Q6PL43, and Q96I73.

References